The Tajikistan national badminton team represents Tajikistan in international badminton team competitions. The national team is controlled by the Badminton Federation of Tajikistan, also known as BFT. Tajiki badminton has grew with the help of the Shuttle Time program organized by the Badminton World Federation. 

Tajikistan first competed internationally when the junior team made their debut in the individual event at the 2016 Badminton Asia U17 & U15 Junior Championships in Kudus, Indonesia.

The Tajiki junior team also competed in the first ever Central Asia Regional Badminton Team Championships in 2022,where the junior mixed team won 3rd place in both U17 and U15 categories.

Participation in Badminton Asia Regional competitions

Central Asia 

Mixed team U17

Mixed team U15

Current squad 
The following players were selected to represent Tajikistan at the 2016 Badminton Asia U17 & U15 Junior Championships.

Male players
Kurbonshokh Mukbilshoev
Aziz Ruzibaev

Female players
Manizha Makhkamboeva
Roziya Rakhimova

References 

Badminton
National badminton teams